WKLP (1390 AM) is a sports formatted broadcast radio station licensed to Keyser, West Virginia, serving Keyser, West Virginia and Mineral County, West Virginia.  WKLP is owned and operated by West Virginia Radio Corporation.

Format flip
On October 13, 2008 WKLP flipped from adult standards to sports carrying programming from ESPN Radio.

External links
ESPN Radio 1390

KLP